Patrizia Pellegrino (born 28 July 1962) is an Italian actress, television personality and singer.

Life and career 
Born in Torre Annunziata, Pellegrino graduated in dance at the San Carlo, Naples. She made her debut in a minor role in the 1977 film Onore e guapparia.  The peak of her career was achieved in the first half of 1980s, when she was active as lead actress in a number of comedy films as well as a showgirl and a presenter of several variety shows on television. From late 1980s she focused her career on stage, in both brilliant and dramatic works, working with Vittorio Gassman and Pietro Garinei, among others.  Pellegrino has also a career as a singer, launched by the Italo disco single "Beng!!!". She participated to the second edition of the Raidue reality show L'Isola dei Famosi.

References

External links 

 

Italian film actresses
Italian television actresses
Italian stage actresses
1962 births
People from the Province of Naples
Living people
Participants in Italian reality television series